Kanailal Niyogi (1924 - 19 May 1961) was an employee of the Indian Railways who took part in the Bengali Language Movement in the Barak Valley in 1961. On 19 May 1961, Niyogi became a martyr when he was shot dead by the paramilitary forces at the Tarapur railway station in Silchar.

Early life 
Kanailal was born in a Bengali Hindu family in Khilda village of the erstwhile Mymensingh district to Dwijendralal and Monorama Niyogi in 1924. After his studies, he got a job in the Bengal Assam Railway. He was posted in Silchar, where he settled with his family. After the Partition of India, Niyogi moved to Silchar permanently.

Martyrdom 
As the Bengali Language Movement gained momentum in the Barak Valley, Niyogi was drawn into it. In spite of being a railway official, he took part in the Satyagraha on 19 May 1961. The primary agenda of the satyagrahis was a rail blockade at Tarapur railway station demanding the official status of Bengali in Assam. The rail blockade program passed off peacefully in the morning. However, in the afternoon, at around 2-35 pm the paramilitary personnel posted at the station started firing at the satyagrahis without any provocation.
 Niyogi suffered bullet wounds and along with others he was taken to Silchar Civil Hospital where he was declared dead. He left behind his wife, two sons and two daughters and his 70-year-old mother.

See also 
 Kamala Bhattacharya
 Sachindra Chandra Pal
 Birendra Sutradhar
 Tarani Debnath

References 

1924 births
1961 deaths
People from Mymensingh District
People from Cachar district
Martyrs
Bengali people
Bengali Language Movement of Assam activists